The Grind may refer to:

 The Grind (TV series), an MTV dance music show
 The Grind (1915 film), a 1915 silent film
 The Grind (2012 film), a 2012 crime film

See also
 My wife (I am married to the grind)
 Grind (disambiguation)